Ihsanullah Mandozai (born 11 May 1997) is an Afghan cricketer. He made his List A debut for Amo Region in the 2017 Ghazi Amanullah Khan Regional One Day Tournament on 16 August 2017. He made his first-class debut for Amo Region in the 2017–18 Ahmad Shah Abdali 4-day Tournament on 20 October 2017.

References

External links
 

1997 births
Living people
Afghan cricketers
Amo Sharks cricketers
Place of birth missing (living people)